A clam pie is a savory meat pie prepared using clams, especially quahogs as a primary ingredient, and it is a part of the cuisine of New England. It likely predated the English settlements in Southern New England, having been a feature of indigenous people's diet. It can also be prepared as a type of pizza pie. White clam pie is a pizza variety that originated in New Haven, Connecticut.

Overview
A clam pie is a savory pie prepared using clams as a main ingredient. Ingredients in addition to whole or chopped clams and pie crust can include potatoes, corn, onion, celery, garlic, clam juice, milk, eggs, hard-boiled eggs, butter, crushed crackers, seasonings, salt and pepper. Fresh or canned clams can be used to prepare the dish, and flour can be used to thicken the mixture. The dish is typically cooked by baking. Clam pie is a part of the cuisine of New England.

History
There is evidence that the Wampanoag tribe of present-day Southern New England and Cape Cod ate pies made from clams before encountering English Settlers in the early 1600s. Pies had been common in medieval Europe and the English settlers to the Plymouth Colony cooked a variety of pies because it was a sure way to preserve foods, so it kept meats and seafood fresh through the long winters before refrigeration.

Variations and famous versions

Pizza

Clam pie can be prepared as a pizza pie using clams as a topping. Fresh or canned clams can be used, and the clams can be minced or whole. 

White clam pie is a pizza variety in New Haven, Connecticut, and is typically prepared using pizza dough, clams, olive oil, grated Romano cheese, garlic and oregano. The dish originated at the Frank Pepe Pizzeria Napoletana restaurant in the Wooster Square neighborhood of New Haven, and was first prepared there sometime in the 1950s.

Bonac Clam Pie
In Eastern Long Island, New York there is a well-known version of clam pie, called Bonac Clam Pie, after the Bonackers, or descendants of the first white settlers of the area who settled around Accabonac Harbor. For many generations, the inhabitants of this part of East Hampton were clammers and fishermen. The recipes used here are handed down from generation to generation and thus vary in ingredients across generations and family lines.

See also
 Fish pie
 List of clam dishes
 List of pizza varieties by country

References

External links
 East End Clam Pie. Saveur.
 "Reader shares clam pie recipe from his Cape Cod mom". Cape Cod Times.

Clam dishes
Pizza varieties
American pies